Manitoba Provincial Road 355 is an east-west provincial road in the southwestern section of the Canadian province of Manitoba.

Route description 
PR 355 begins at the east boundary of the Birdtail Sioux First Nation, and terminates at PTH 16A in Minnedosa.

From Birdtail Sioux First Nation, it travels  before it intersects PTH 83 just north of Beulah. PTH 21 and PR 355 continue in concurrence south for  before PR 355 leaves the concurrence and continues east, traveling  to meet southbound PR 354. The two roads run in concurrence for  before PR 354 turns north and leaves the concurrence. The two roads also run in concurrence for  before PR 250 also turns north and leaves the concurrence. PR 355 continues east for  into Minnedosa, reaching its eastbound terminus with PTH 16A in the town's north end.

PR 355 is known as 6th Avenue N.W. within Minnedosa's town limits.

History 

The western terminus of PR 355 was extended to the Birdtail Sioux First Nation in 2004. Prior to this, the road's westbound terminus was at PTH 83, making the original length .

References

External links 
Manitoba Official Map - West Central

355